Malé Březno may refer to the following locations in the Czech Republic:

 Malé Březno (Most District), a village in Most District
 Malé Březno (Ústí nad Labem District), a village in Ústí nad Labem District